Rachael Cox (born 13 September 1975) is an Australian Paralympic sailor.    She won a silver medal at the 2008 Beijing Games in the Mixed Two Person SKUD18 event.

References

1975 births
Living people
Australian female sailors (sport)
Paralympic sailors of Australia
Sailors at the 2008 Summer Paralympics
Paralympic silver medalists for Australia
Medalists at the 2008 Summer Paralympics
Paralympic medalists in sailing
21st-century Australian women